Heavy Rules Mixtape is an extended play/mixtape by Finnish singer and songwriter Alma. It was released through PME Records and Warner Music Finland on 2 March 2018. Songs for the extended play were written and recorded in 2017 and early 2018. The extended play was produced by Axident, Hank Solo, Mag, Jason Gill and features guest appearances by MØ, Tove Styrke and Kiiara.

Background

Alma released her debut extended play Dye My Hair in 2016. In 2017, she was featured on Sub Focus' single "Don't You Feel It" and Martin Solveig's single "All Stars" and released solo singles "Chasing Highs" and "Phases" with French Montana. In February 2018, it was announced that Alma would release Heavy Rules Mixtape the following month. Alma said that she decided to release more music, because "I’m going on tour and I have these festival shows and everything, and it feels super horrible to play these gigs and to have so few songs out". In an interview with Paper, Alma spoke of the recording process, saying:

Critical reception
Heavy Rules Mixtape received positive reception from Idolator, according to which "it goes hard from the opening track and maintains that quality and energy until the final beat" Paper wrote of the release that it is "full-on pop, packed with slick club synths and smart lyrics that build into enormous choruses". Nylon wrote that the EP is "one of the finest releases to come out of the pop scene" in 2018. Finnish newspaper Helsingin Sanomat gave the release four stars.

Track listing

Charts

References

External links
 

2018 EPs
2018 mixtape albums
Alma (Finnish singer) albums
Pop music EPs
Warner Music Group EPs
Virgin Records EPs